Bezek or Bezeq may refer to:
Bezeq, an Israeli telecommunications provider
Bezek, a village in Chelm County in eastern Poland
Bezek, in southern Canaan, where the Israelites defeated King Adoni-Bezek
Bezek, what Felix Fabri called Beit Jala

Bezek, a large family located in Germany, state lower saxony